Reilly Opelka defeated Jenson Brooksby in the final, 7–6(7–5), 7–6(7–3) to win the singles title at the 2022 Dallas Open. This was the first edition of the tournament.

The 24–22 second set tiebreak between Opelka and John Isner in the semifinals was the longest tiebreak in a tour-level match since the ATP Tour started in 1990.

Seeds 
The top four seeds received a bye into the second round.

Draw

Finals

Top half

Bottom half

Qualifying

Seeds

Qualifiers

Qualifying draw

First qualifier

Second qualifier

Third qualifier

Fourth qualifier

References

External links
 Main draw
 Qualifying draw

Dallas Open - 1
Dallas Open (2022)